Locomotion means the act or ability of something to transport or move itself from place to place.

Locomotion may refer to:

Motion
 Motion (physics)
 Robot locomotion, of man-made devices

By environment
 Aquatic locomotion
 Flight
 Locomotion in space
 Terrestrial locomotion

Biological locomotion

Animal locomotion
 Animal locomotion
 Climbing
 Crawl (disambiguation)
 Flight
 Fish locomotion (swimming, others)
 Gait analysis
 Horse gaits
 Trot (horse gait)
 Jumping
 Running
 Slithering, limbless terrestrial locomotion
 Snake locomotion
 Swimming
 Walking

Fine and gross motor skills

 Fine motor skills (smaller muscles; fine movements)
 Gross motor skills (larger muscles; large movements)

Microbial locomotion
 Microswimmer
 Protist locomotion, locomotion of unicellular eukaryotes
 Bacterial motility

Arts, entertainment, and media

Clubs
 Loco Motion (Youth Group), a film and media club based in Essex, UK

Games
 Loco-Motion (video game), a 1982 arcade game by Konami
 Chris Sawyer's Locomotion, a 2004 computer game by Chris Sawyer

Music
 "Locomotion", a song on John Coltrane's 1958 hard bop album Blue Train
 "The Loco-Motion", a 1962 pop song originally performed by Little Eva
 "Locomotion" (Kylie Minogue song), a 1987 version by Kylie Minogue
 "Locomotion" (Orchestral Manoeuvres in the Dark song), a 1984 pop song by Orchestral Manoeuvres in the Dark

Publications
 Locomotion (periodical), a railway-related magazine
 Locomotion, a young adult novel in poetic form by Jacqueline Woodson

Television
 Locomotion (TV channel), cable TV channel in Latin America

Other
 Locomotion No. 1, an early steam locomotive by George Stephenson
 Shildon Locomotion Museum, in the town of Shildon, County Durham, England
 Travel

See also
 "Loco-Emotion", a song on Kix's album Cool Kids
 Locomotive (disambiguation)
 Locomotor (disambiguation)